The Hunter 170 is an American sailing dinghy that was designed the Hunter Design Team and first built in 1999.

Production
The design was built by Hunter Marine in the United States, starting in 1999 but is now out of production.

The design was replaced in production by the slightly larger Marlow-Hunter 18, which was introduced in 2011.

Design

The Hunter 170 is a small, unsinkable, recreational dinghy, built predominantly of ACP. It has a fractional sloop rig, a raked stem, an open reverse transom, a transom-hung rudder controlled by a tiller and a retractable centerboard.

The boat displaces , has  of built-in positive flotation and can accommodate up to six people.

The boat may be fitted with a small outboard motor for docking and maneuvering and a      motor was a factory option. Other factory options included a  asymmetrical spinnaker, a road trailer and a launching dolly.

See also
List of sailing boat types

Related development
Hunter 146
Marlow-Hunter 18

Similar sailboats
Laser 2

References

External links

Official brochure

Dinghies
1990s sailboat type designs
Sailboat type designs by Hunter Design Team
Sailboat types built by Hunter Marine